David or Dave Williams may refer to:

Architects
David Williams (Australian architect) (1856–1940), South Australian architect 
David L. Williams (architect) (1866–1937), American architect
David Williams (Alaska architect) (fl. 1930s), architect and community planner in Alaska

Art
David Dougal Williams (1888–1944), British artist and art teacher
David E. Williams (1933–1985), American Kiowa-Tonkawa-Kiowa Apache painter from Oklahoma
David B. Williams (artist) (1947–2009), Canadian Ojibway aboriginal painter and printmaker

Film, television and radio
David Williams (screenwriter), British television screenwriter
David Williams, Australian film distributor, 1984 winner of the Raymond Longford Award
David Walliams (David Edward Williams, born 1971), British comedian and author, especially of children books
Dave Williams (radio announcer) (born 1971), Australian radio host
David Williams (producer), American film director and producer for ADV Films
David L. Williams (film director), British film director

Law
David Williams (English judge) (died 1613), Justice of the King's Bench
David W. Williams (1910–2000), American federal judge
Sir David Williams (British legal scholar) (1930–2009), Vice-Chancellor of the University of Cambridge, 1989–1996
Sir David Williams (arbitrator) (born 1941), New Zealand lawyer, jurist, and international arbitrator
David C. Williams (inspector general) (born 1947), Inspector General of the U.S. Postal Service
David Williams (New Zealand legal scholar)

Military and naval
David Williams (pirate) (fl. 1698-1708), Welsh pirate active near Madagascar
David Williams (soldier) (1754–1831), one of the captors of British spy John Andre in the American Revolutionary War
Sir David Williams (Royal Navy officer) (1921–2012), British Royal Navy admiral, Second Sea Lord, 1974–1977

Music
Dave "Fat Man" Williams (1920–1982), New Orleans jazz, blues, and rhythm and blues pianist
David "Happy" Williams (born 1946), Trinidadian jazz double-bassist
David Williams (guitarist) (1950–2009), American session guitarist
Dave Williams (singer) (1972–2002), American rock singer
David Williams (Australian indigenous musician) (born 1983), Aboriginal musician and artist
David Williams (born 1986), Welsh guitarist in Son of Dork
David Williams (born 1986), musician formerly with The Dear & Departed
David Williams, Australian musician with Augie March
David Williams, head of Shock Records
David C. Williams (film composer), American film composer

Politics and government
David Williams (Brecon MP) (died 1613), MP for Brecon
David Rogerson Williams (1776–1830), governor of South Carolina, 1814–1816
David Williams (Liberal politician) (1799–1869), British Member of Parliament for Merioneth, 1868–1870
David Williams (Swansea East MP) (1865–1941), Labour Member of Parliament for Swansea East, 1922–1940
David G. Williams (died 1903), member of the Wisconsin legislature
David C. Williams (politician), member of the California legislature
D. J. Williams (politician) (David James Williams, 1897–1972), British miner and checkweighman who became a Labour Party Member of Parliament
David B. Williams (politician) (1919–1994), American jurist and politician, member of the Massachusetts House of Representatives 
David Williams (trade unionist) (born 1926), Welsh trade unionist
Delwyn Williams (David John Delwyn Williams, born 1938), British Conservative politician, MP for Montgomeryshire, 1979–1983
Sir David Williams (Richmond upon Thames politician) (born 1939), Leader of Richmond upon Thames Council, 1983–2001
David Williams (Australian politician) (born 1941), Australian politician
David L. Williams (politician) (born 1953), Kentucky judge, president of the Kentucky Senate and 2011 gubernatorial nominee
Dave Williams (Colorado politician), member of the Colorado House of Representatives
Dave Williams (Iowa politician), member of the Iowa House of Representatives
David Williams (civil servant) (born 1968), British civil servant

Religion
David Williams (minister, born 1709) (1709–1784), Welsh independent minister and schoolmaster
David Williams (philosopher) (1738–1816), Welsh minister, theologian and political polemicist
David Williams (Oxford academic) (1786–1860), Vice-Chancellor of Oxford University, 1856–1858
David Archard Williams (fl. 1865–1879), Welsh Anglican priest
David Williams (priest, born 1841) (1841–1929), Archdeacon of Cardigan, 1903–1928
David Williams (archdeacon of St David's) (1847–1920), Welsh Anglican priest
David Williams (archbishop of Huron) (1853–1931), Welsh-born Anglican Bishop of Huron and later Metropolitan of Ontario
David Williams (priest, born 1862) (1862–1936), Archdeacon of Cardigan, 1928–1936
David Williams (Methodist minister, born 1877) (1877–1927), Welsh theologian and minister
David Rhys Williams (1890–1970), American Unitarian minister
David Williams (bishop of Basingstoke) (born 1961), Anglican Bishop of Basingstoke

Science and space
David Williams (geologist, born 1792) (1792–1850), English geologist and priest
David Hiram Williams (1812–1848), Welsh geological surveyor
David Williams (geologist, born 1898) (1898–1984), British professor of geology
Sir David Innes Williams (1919–2013), British paediatric urologist
David Williams (astrochemist) (born 1937), British astrochemist
David Williams (archaeologist) (1949–2017), British archaeologist
David Williams (space administrator) (born 1951), Chief Executive of the UK Space Agency
Dafydd Williams (born 1954), Canadian astronaut
David R. Williams (scientist) (born 1954), American professor of sociology and public health
David B. Williams (materials scientist), British materials scientist, former dean of the College of Engineering at Ohio State University
David Williams (mathematician), Welsh mathematician in probability theory
David Williams (Canadian physician), Canadian physician, Ontario's Chief Medical Officer of Health

Sports

Association football
Dai Williams (fl. 1912–1921), also known as Dave Williams, English footballer
David Williams (footballer, born 1931) (1931–2012), English footballer
Dave Williams (footballer, born 1942) (1942–2015), Welsh football coach and player for Newport County
David Williams (footballer, born 1955), Welsh football coach and player for Bristol Rovers
David Williams (footballer, born 1968), English football goalkeeper
David Williams (Australian soccer) (born 1988), Australian soccer player

Gridiron football
Dave Williams (wide receiver) (born 1945), American football player
Dave Williams (running back) (born 1954), American football player
David Williams, American football player, see Atlanta Falcons draft history
David Williams (wide receiver) (born 1963), American football player at the University of Illinois
David Williams (offensive lineman) (born 1966), American football offensive lineman
D. J. Williams (tight end) (born 1988), American football tight end
David Williams (running back) (born 1994), American football running back

Australian rules football
David Williams (Australian rules footballer) (born 1961), former Australian rules footballer

Baseball
Dave Williams (1900s pitcher) (1881–1918), American baseball pitcher
David Williams (2000s pitcher) (born 1979), American baseball pitcher

Cricket
David Williams (cricketer, born 1948), English cricketer
David Williams (cricketer, born 1963), West Indian cricketer

Rugby league
Dave Williams (rugby league, born 1967), rugby league footballer of the 1990s for Wales, Welsh Students, and South Wales Dragons
David Williams (rugby league, born 1986), Australian rugby league player
Dave Williams (rugby league, born 1989), rugby league footballer for Harlequins RL

Rugby union
David Williams (rugby union, born 1894) (1894–1959), Australian rugby union player
David Williams (rugby union, born 1995), English rugby union player

Other sports
David Williams (tennis), see 1929 Wimbledon Championships – Men's Singles
Dave Williams (basketball) (1913–1983), American basketball player
Tiger Williams (David Williams, born 1954), Canadian ice hockey player
David Williams (judoka) (born 1965), American judoka
David Williams (sailor) (born 1966), British Olympic sailor
David Williams (ice hockey) (born 1967), American ice hockey player
David Williams (born 1972), American wrestler better known by the ring name David Young
David Williams (card game player) (born 1980), American poker player
David Williams (American cyclist) (born 1988), American cyclist
David Williams (Canadian cyclist) (born 1994), Canadian cyclist
David Williams (darts player), see 2011 PDC Under-21 World Championship
David Williams (golfer), see Atlantic Open
David Williams (racing driver), see 1982 British Formula One season

Writers
David John Williams (1885–1970), Welsh-language writer and Welsh nationalist
David Williams (historian) (1900–1978), Welsh historian
Gwyn Williams (writer) (David Gwyn Williams, 1904–1990), Welsh poet, novelist, translator and academic
David Williams (crime writer) (1926–2003), British advertising executive and crime writer
David Williams (medievalist) (1939–2015), Canadian medieval literature scholar
David J. Williams (born 1971), American science fiction writer and video game writer
David Williams (journalist), Australian author and journalist
David Williams (natural history writer), American natural history writer

Other people
David Williams (businessman, born 1969), British entrepreneur and founder of Avanti Communications Group plc
David Williams (coal owner) (1809–1863), Welsh industrialist
David A. Williams, American president and CEO of the Make-A-Wish Foundation
David Henry Williams (1819–1897), American railroad surveyor, civil engineer and writer
David Marshall Williams (1900–1975), American inventor
Russell Williams (criminal) (David Russell Williams, born 1963), Canadian convicted murderer, rapist, and officer in the Canadian Forces

Fictional characters
Dave Williams (Desperate Housewives), a fictional character on the TV series Desperate Housewives
David Williams, character in Another Man, Another Chance

See also
Davey Williams (disambiguation)
David William (1926–2010), British/Canadian actor and director